The Meteor Man is a 1993 American superhero comedy film written, directed, co-produced and starring Robert Townsend with supporting roles by Marla Gibbs, Eddie Griffin, Robert Guillaume, James Earl Jones, Bill Cosby, and Another Bad Creation. The film also features special appearances by Luther Vandross, Sinbad, Naughty by Nature, Cypress Hill, and Big Daddy Kane. Townsend stars as a mild-mannered schoolteacher, who becomes a superhero after his neighborhood in Washington, D.C. is terrorized by street gangs.

It is one of the earliest superhero films to feature an African-American in a starring role.

Plot
Jefferson Reed (Robert Townsend) is a mild-mannered school teacher in Washington, D.C. His neighborhood is terrorized by a local gang called The Golden Lords, led by  Simon Caine (Roy Fegan) and allied with drug lord Anthony Byers (Frank Gorshin). One night, Jeff steps in to rescue a woman from the gang only to end up running from them himself. Hiding in a garbage dumpster, he manages to escape. As he climbs out, he is struck down by a glowing, green meteorite. His spine is crushed and he receives severe burns. A small fragment of the meteor was left over and taken by a vagrant named Marvin (Bill Cosby). Reed awakens several days later in the hospital, but when his bandages are taken off, he is miraculously healed of all injuries.

Jeff soon discovered that the meteorite had left him with spectacular superpowers such as flight, x-ray/laser vision, superhuman strength, speed, and hearing, invulnerability, healing powers, the ability to absorb a book's content by touch, super breath, telepathy with dogs (which he uses to communicate with his own dog Ellington), and telekinesis. Confiding this to his parents Ted (Robert Guillaume) and Maxine (Marla Gibbs), they convince him to use his powers to help the community. His mother designs a costume and as the Meteor Man, he takes on the Golden Lords. He shuts down 15 crack houses, stops 11 robberies, brings peace between the police, the Crips (Cypress Hill), and the Bloods (Naughty by Nature) where they begin to work together to rebuild the community they destroyed, and plants a giant garden in the middle of the ghetto.

The Golden Lords learn Meteor Man's secret identity and his slowly diminishing powers. As the violence gets out of hand and the Golden Lords continue their attacks, the community members plan to make a deal with them, but Jeff instead teaches them about fighting for their beliefs. A now-powerless Jeff fights Simon and is beaten up. Simon points his gun at Jeff, but Jeff's neighbor Earnest Moses (James Earl Jones) throws a record at him, successfully knocking the gun out of Simon's hand. Suddenly, Marvin uses the meteor fragment to strip the Golden Lords of their guns. This enables the locals to stand up to the Golden Lords as they fight them alongside Marvin's dogs. Marvin accidentally drops the meteor and both Jeff and Simon grab the rock from both sides, gaining superpowers, and engage in a brawl.

When Simon is about to throw a dumpster at Jeff, he hears Ellington barking, telling Jeff that he can win, and throws the dumpster at Ellington instead, seriously injuring him. This angers Jeff and he disappears and returns as Meteor Man. They continue with their brawl with Meteor Man winning and draining Simon of his powers by absorbing them. He then defeats the rest of the Golden Lords. The locals all gather around Ellington who is now lying on the street, whimpering in pain. Jeff uses his x-ray vision to see that Ellington's ribs are broken. Before Jeff can do anything, his powers fade away, again. But just then, Marvin comes over and uses the last of his powers from the meteor fragment to heal Ellington's injuries, thus saving Ellington's life. The locals all applaud.

Anthony Byers and his gang then confront Meteor Man, but are out-numbered by the Bloods and the Crips who show up to protect Meteor Man. Anthony Byers and his gang are then arrested by the police after attempting to "take a vacation to the Bahamas".

Cast

Production
Although Washington was the setting, the movie was actually shot in the Reservoir Hill neighborhood in Baltimore, Maryland.

Soundtrack
 "It's for You" – Shanice
 "Don't Waste My Time" – Lisa Taylor
 "You Turn Me On" – Hi-Five
 "Who Can" – Ahmad
 "Your Future Is Our Future" – Daryl Coley & Frank McComb
 "I Say a Prayer" – Howard Hewett
 "Is It Just Too Much" – Keith Washington
 "Somebody Cares for You" – Frank McComb
 "Good Love" – Elaine Stepter
 "Ain't Nobody Bad (Like Meteor Man)" – Big Hat Ray Ray
 "Can't Let Her Get Away" - Michael Jackson

Comic

Marvel Comics produced an adaptation (Meteor Man: The Movie) and a sequel in the form of the six-issue limited series titled Meteor Man written by Bert Hubbard and Dwight Coye, and illustrated by Robert Walker and Jon Holdredge. In the comic, set in the mainstream Marvel Universe, Meteor Man met Spider-Man and Night Thrasher. Many years later, the Golden Lords reappeared on the pages of Miles Morales: Spider-Man #5.

Reception
Rotten Tomatoes gives the film a score of 29% based on 17 critic reviews.

Peter Rainer of the Los Angeles Times compares the film to "a fairly clunky sitcom" with its sense of righteous do-goodism, and although the film intends to inspire, it instead sends the message that it would take a superhero to clean up inner-city gang violence.  
Roger Ebert gave the film 2.5 (out of 4) stars, writing "The movie contains big laughs and moments of genuine feeling, but it seems to be put together out of assorted inspirations that were never assembled into one coherent story line....Kids may like the film and anyone can enjoy the moments of inspiration, but 'The Meteor Man' could have been better if it had tried to do less, more carefully."

The film gained some cult followings.

Awards
The film received a Saturn Award nomination for Best Science Fiction Film, but lost to Jurassic Park.

References

External links
 
 
 The Meteor Man at Superheroes Lives

1993 films
1993 action comedy films
1990s science fiction comedy films
1990s science fiction action films
American science fiction action films
Metro-Goldwyn-Mayer films
Films set in Washington, D.C.
Films shot in Baltimore
American action comedy films
American science fiction comedy films
African-American superhero films
1990s superhero comedy films
Film superheroes
Films scored by Cliff Eidelman
Films directed by Robert Townsend
Films adapted into comics
1990s English-language films
1990s American films
Parodies of Superman
African-American films